Marion Butler Birthplace is a historic home located near Salemburg, Sampson County, North Carolina.   It was built about 1860, and is a one-story, double-pile plan, frame farmhouse. It has a low hipped roof, three-bay hipped porch, and has a later rear ell.  It was the birthplace of Marion Butler (1863-1938), North Carolina politician and chairman of the national Populist party in 1896.  It was moved in 1991.

It was added to the National Register of Historic Places in 1986.

References

Houses on the National Register of Historic Places in North Carolina
Houses completed in 1860
Houses in Sampson County, North Carolina
National Register of Historic Places in Sampson County, North Carolina
Birthplaces of individual people